Clostridium paradoxum is a moderately thermophilic anaerobic alkaliphile bacteria. It is motile with 2-6 peritrichous flagella and forms round to slightly oval terminal spores. Its type strain is JW-YL-7 (DSM 7308).

References

Further reading

Cook, Gregory M., et al. "The Intracellular pH of Clostridium paradoxum, an Anaerobic, Alkaliphilic, and Thermophilic Bacterium." Applied and Environmental Microbiology 62.12 (1996): 4576–4579.

External links

LPSN
Type strain of Clostridium paradoxum at BacDive -  the Bacterial Diversity Metadatabase

Gram-positive bacteria
Bacteria described in 1993
paradoxum